Amaro Miranda da Cunha (15 June 1912 – 15 March 1988) was a Brazilian rower. He competed in the men's eight event at the 1932 Summer Olympics. He was the brother of Carmen Miranda.

Notes

References

External links
 

1912 births
1988 deaths
Brazilian male rowers
Olympic rowers of Brazil
Rowers at the 1932 Summer Olympics
Rowers from Rio de Janeiro (city)